DPO may refer to:

Economics
 Data protection officer, a corporate officer responsible for data protection under the EU's General Data Protection Regulation
 Days payables outstanding, in finance
 Detrended price oscillator, an indicator in financial technical analysis
 Direct public offering, a method by which a business can offer an investment opportunity to the public

Entertainment
 "D.P.O." (The X-Files), a 1995 episode of The X-Files
 Dayton Philharmonic Orchestra
 Dublin Philharmonic Orchestra

Other
 Dame of the Pontifical Order of Pius IX, female variant of a class in one of the orders of knighthood of the Holy See
 Department of Peace Operations, a United Nations department in charge of peacekeeping 
 Devonport Airport, IATA code
 Digital Phosphor Oscilloscope, a type of electronic test instrument
 Double pushout graph rewriting, in computer science
 Discontinued post office
 Diplomatic post office, a mailing addresses for diplomatic missions of the United States